Pasarit Promsombat (born 5 March 1983) is a Thai racing driver currently competing in the TCR International Series and TCR Thailand Touring Car Championship. Having previously competed in the Thailand Super Series and Honda Pro Cup Thailand amongst others.

Racing career
Promsombat began his career in 2005 in the Thailand Yokohama Gymkhana Championship. In 2007 he switched to the Honda Racing Festival Thailand winning his class that year, returning for the event and winning his class in 2011, 2012 and 2013. For 2008 he switched to the Puma FAEast Series taking four wins. He also raced in the Honda Pro Cup Thailand that year, also taking several victories. In 2009 he made his Thailand Super Series debut, winning the 2000 Class that year and returning the following year also winning the class. In 2009 he also took part in the Honda Jazz Series Thailand, winning the title the same year. For 2012 he returned to the Thailand Super Series, this time entering the Super Production 1500 Class, eventually winning the class. In 2013 and 2014 he took part in the Bangsaen 6 Hours endurance race, winning the race on both occasions. He once again entered the Thailand Super Series in 2014, continuing in the series for three seasons through the 2016 season. Eventually winning his class all three years. In 2016 he entered the Buriram 6 Hours endurance race, going on to eventually win the race. For the 2017 season he switched to the  TCR Thailand Touring Car Championship, driving a SEAT León TCR for his own RMI Racing Team by Sunoco.

In August 2017 it was announced that he would race in the TCR International Series, driving an SEAT León TCR for his own TCR Thailand team RMI Racing Team by Sunoco.

Racing record

Complete TCR International Series results
(key) (Races in bold indicate pole position) (Races in italics indicate fastest lap)

† Driver did not finish the race, but was classified as he completed over 90% of the race distance.
* Season still in progress.

References

External links
 

1983 births
Living people
TCR International Series drivers
Pasarit Promsombat
24H Series drivers
TCR Asia Series drivers
Pasarit Promsombat